Henry Welles may refer to:

 Henry C. Welles (1821–1868), American druggist and businessman, thought of as one of the founders of Memorial Day
 Henry T. Welles (1821–1898), lawyer, businessman and politician, mayor of St. Anthony, Minnesota

See also
Henry Wells (disambiguation)